Eschata quadrispinea is a moth in the family Crambidae. It was described by Wei-Chun Li in 2012. It has been found in the Jiangxi province of China.

References

Chiloini
Moths described in 2012
Moths of Asia